The 2019 Pan American Table Tennis Championships were held in Asunción, Paraguay from 3 to 8 September 2019.

Medal summary

Events

Medal table

See also
2019 ITTF Pan-America Cup

References

Pan American Table Tennis Championships
Pan American Table Tennis Championships
Pan American Table Tennis Championships
International sports competitions in Asunción
Table tennis competitions in Paraguay
International sports competitions hosted by Paraguay
Pan American Table Tennis Championships